Seesa is a 2016 Indian Telugu-language film directed by Mohamad Issack, starring Sivaji, Chesvaa and Namratha. Seesa also has been shot in a single take like its original Agadam.

Plot

Seesa is a thriller film all about human emotions in a bottle, where a 'ghost' takes revenge on her enemies.

Cast

Sivaji
Chaswa
Namratha
Tharika
Rohith Bhanuprakash

Remake

Seesa is the remake of Tamil film Agadam which has been awarded the Guinness World Record for the longest uncut film that had a running time for 2 hours, 3 minutes and 30 seconds, a first in world cinema.

Release

Seesa was released on 18 March 2016 across Telangana and Andhra Pradesh.

References

External links

2010s Telugu-language films
2016 horror thriller films
Indian horror thriller films
2016 films
Indian horror film remakes
Telugu remakes of Tamil films
2016 horror films
One-shot films